In enzymology, a formimidoylglutamase is an enzyme that catalyzes the chemical reaction

N-formimidoyl-L-glutamate + H2O  L-glutamate + formamide

Thus, the two substrates of this enzyme are N-formimidoyl-L-glutamate and H2O, whereas its two products are L-glutamate and formamide.

This enzyme belongs to the family of hydrolases, those acting on carbon-nitrogen bonds other than peptide bonds, specifically in linear amidines.  The systematic name of this enzyme class is N-formimidoyl-L-glutamate formimidoylhydrolase. Other names in common use include formiminoglutamase, N-formiminoglutamate hydrolase, and N-formimino-L-glutamate formiminohydrolase.  This enzyme participates in histidine metabolism.

Structural studies

References

 
 

EC 3.5.3
Enzymes of known structure